The Croatian Handball Premier League is the highest men's handball league in Croatia. It is organized by the Croatian Handball Federation (Hrvatski rukometni savez). The league comprises 16 teams. 

The league was formed in 1991 with the dissolution of the Yugoslav leagues.

Format
In the first phase, eight teams from two groups compete in a home-and-away round-robin series. All teams advance from the regular season to one of two postseason stages, depending on their league position. The top four teams from the regular season play in the Championship Round, while the bottom four teams play in the Relegation Round. At the end of the season, the bottom finisher is automatically relegated to the second league.

Past champions

 1992 : Zagreb Loto
 1993 : Badel 1862 Zagreb (2)
 1994 : Badel 1862 Zagreb (3)
 1995 : Badel 1862 Zagreb (4)
 1996 : Croatia banka Zagreb (5)
 1997 : Badel 1862 Zagreb (6)
 1998 : Badel 1862 Zagreb (7)
 1999 : Badel 1862 Zagreb (8)
 2000 : Badel 1862 Zagreb (9)
 2001 : RK Zagreb (10)
 2002 : RK Zagreb (11)
 2003 : RK Zagreb (12)
 2004 : RK Zagreb (13)
 2005 : RK Zagreb (14)
 2006 : RK Zagreb (15)
 2007 : RK CO Zagreb (16)
 2008 : RK CO Zagreb (17)
 2009 : RK CO Zagreb (18)
 2010 : RK CO Zagreb (19)
 2011 : RK CO Zagreb (20)
 2012: RK CO Zagreb (21)
 2013 : RK Zagreb (22)
 2014 : RK Zagreb (23)
 2015 : RK PPD Zagreb (24)
 2016 : RK PPD Zagreb (25)
 2017: RK PPD Zagreb (26)
 2018 : RK PPD Zagreb (27)
 2019 : RK PPD Zagreb (28)
 2020 : Voided due to the coronavirus pandemic
 2021 : RK PPD Zagreb (29)
 2022 : RK PPD Zagreb (30)

won by the green table

EHF coefficients

The following data indicates Croatian coefficient rankings between European handball leagues.

Country ranking
EHF League Ranking for 2018/19 season:

6.  (6)  Danish Handball League (63.33)
7.  (8)  Macedonian Handball Super League (51.22)
8.  (9)  Croatian Handball Premier League (42.25)
9.  (10)  Portuguese Handball First Division (37.33)
10.  (7)  Slovenian First League (men's handball) (36.67)

Club ranking
EHF Club Ranking as of 3 March 2019:

 13.  Zagreb (523)
 42.  Nexe Našice (223)
 105.  Varaždin (66)
 115.  Dubrava (61)
 162.  Poreč (37)

See also

 Croatian First League (women's handball)
 Yugoslav Handball Championship

References

External links
Croatian Handball Federation

 
Premier Handball League
Croatia
Professional sports leagues in Croatia